Ommanney Bay is an Arctic waterway in Qikiqtaaluk Region, Nunavut, Canada. It is located in Parry Channel and is a large inlet on the west side of Prince of Wales Island. It was named after the Victorian Arctic explorer and Royal Navy officer Sir Erasmus Ommanney.

Geography
Smith Bay and Scott Bay are eastern arms of Ommanney Bay.

Bays of Qikiqtaaluk Region